State Highway 17 (SH-17) is a state highway in Bihar state. It covers two major districts (Buxar district and Rohtas district) of Bihar state. This state highway starts from Chausa and ends at Sasaram.

In Bihar, it is known as the Buxar-Chausa-Sasaram road.

Route
The route of SH-17 from north to south direction is as follows:

 Chausa 
 Rajpur 
 Kochas
 Sasaram

References 

State Highways in Bihar